Street Sultans is a Documentary about parkour in Iran. It is the first collaboration documentary film of Paliz Khoshdel and Zeinab Tabrizy

Story
There are several young people who were the pioneer of a dangerous street sport: Parkour. The sport is derived from modern cultural society. They are trying to hold a festival in Tehran.

National awards

Won “Special Award For The Best Film” from Iranian Critics and Writers Association, 2010
Won “Best Semi-Long Film” Award from Independent “Image of the Year” Festival, 2010
Won “Best Director” Award in Semi-Long Documentary section at “City” International Film Festival, 2011
Won “Best Semi-Long Documentary Film” Award from “Iranian Cinema Ceremony“ at Iranian House Of Cinema 2011.

International awards and screening

Won “Best Film” Award at Six Weeks of Iranian Art, Canadian Film Festival 2012
Earned “Certificate of Achievement” at Canada's 2nd Iranian Film Festival 2010
Film Screening at Online Women Filmmakers (of Iran) Uppsala Film Festival, Sweden 2012
Film Screening at DHfest film festival in Mexico city, 2014
Film Screening at Cinéma(s) D’Iran 2014
Film Screening at UCLA Celebration of Iranian Cinema, U.S.A 2013
Participated at Media Wave Film Festival, Hungary 2013

References

Further reading

Iranian documentary films
Parkour
Films set in Tehran
Sport in Iran